Danny Ben-Moshe is a documentary film maker and an associate professor at Deakin University in Melbourne, Australia.
He has produced and directed several critically praised documentaries.

Career
In 2001, Ben-Moshe was presented with the Commonwealth Centenary of Federation medal for leadership against and research into racism in Australia.
These include The Buchenwald Ball (2006) about Holocaust survivors in Australia celebrating the sixtieth anniversary of their liberation, which screened on SBS Television in Australia.

His 2010 film The End of the Rainbow was screened on ABC Television in Australia, and was about a week in the life of The Rainbow Hotel, an iconic live music venue in Melbourne, and how community spaces and cultural heritage are threatened by property development.

His 2011 documentary Carnaby Street Undressed  was broadcast on the Yesterday Television channel in the UK, was reviewed as pick of the week in The Sunday Times & London’s Time Out awarded it 4 stars.

In 2012, Ben-Moshe co-produced, co-directed and was the lead catalyst in the documentary Rewriting History about the emergence of Double Genocide and the rewriting of the history of the Holocaust in Lithuania. It received critical acclaim from The Australian newspaper. It was initially screened on SBS Television in Australia.

In 2017, Ben-Moshe wrote, produced and directed the documentary Shalom Bollywood: The Untold Story of Jews and India's Bollywood.

Ben-Moshe is a Principal Research Fellow at the Centre for Citizenship and Globalisation at Deakin University in Melbourne where he specialises in diaspora and transnational studies as well as research on anti-semitism, Jewish identity and multiculturalism . He is the co-author of the book Israel, the Diaspora and Jewish Identity and his major study on comparative diasporas in Australia was launched at Parliament House in the Australian Capital in 2012.

Ben-Moshe has also written widely for newspapers and magazines including The Age, The Australian, The Canberra Times, and The Jerusalem Post. He is the co-author of The Seventy Year Declaration on the Final Solution Conference at Wannsee, and is involved in the ongoing campaign to preserve the truth about the Holocaust and to refute Double Genocide in Lithuania and elsewhere. He has written widely on this in the media.

Selected publications

Media articles

 Modern migrant's loyalty is an asset to the world, The Age, 26 February 2013*
 Saying no to double genocide, The Jerusalem Post, 3 March 2012
 Lithuania Assaults Holocaust Memory, The Jerusalem Report, 7 November 2011
 Lithuania Obfuscates the Holocaust, The Jerusalem Report, 4 July 2011
 In India, Coexistence Won’t be Murdered, The Jerusalem Report, 22 December 2008
 A Progressive Zionist Dilemma, The Jerusalem Report, 15 February 2010

Publications

Book chapters

Books
 The Diaspora and Jewish Identity, Coeditor, Sussex Academic Press, 2007.

Journal articles

Non-Academic Publications

Filmography
Released Films

References

External links

Identity Films
Deacon University, Centre for Citizenship and Globalisation

Year of birth missing (living people)
Living people
Australian Jews
Australian documentary filmmakers
Academic staff of the Victoria University, Melbourne
Academic staff of Deakin University